The Bad Doctor is a 2014 graphic novel by Ian Williams, published by Myriad Editions. Williams is a doctor in Wales. It was the first graphic novel published by the author.

The main character, Iwan James, is based on the author, and suffers from obsessive–compulsive disorder.

References

External links
 The Bad Doctor - Myriad
 Book review of The Bad Doctor by Sathyaraj Venkatesan in Journal of Graphic Novels and Comics is available here:
 https://www.tandfonline.com/doi/abs/10.1080/21504857.2016.1149082

2014 graphic novels
Novels about obsessive–compulsive disorder
Novels set in Wales